Feral Interactive is a British video games developer and publisher for macOS, Linux, iOS, Android,  Nintendo Switch and Microsoft Windows platforms. It was founded in 1996 to bring games to Mac and specialises in porting games to different platforms.

Feral have partnered with publishers like Square Enix Europe, 2K Games, Sega Europe, Warner Bros. Interactive Entertainment and Codemasters to port and publish their games for platforms that the publishers themselves are not supporting. It has offered its games on digital download services like Direct2Drive since 2011.

History 
From 1996 to 2013, Feral Interactive published games exclusively for macOS. In June 2014, Feral released its first game for Linux, XCOM: Enemy Unknown. In November 2016, Feral released its first game for iOS, Rome: Total War for iPad, following in November 2017 with its first iOS release simultaneously for both iPhone and iPad, GRID Autosport. Feral's first Android release, Rome: Total War, came in December 2018. Feral Interactive releases its first Nintendo Switch title, GRID Autosport,  in September 2019. Feral developed the remaster of Rome: Total War in collaboration with Creative Assembly, released in April 2021, which is its first game for Windows.

Awards
In 2006, the Mac version of The Movies won a BAFTA award for the best game in the Simulation category. In 2012, the Mac version of Deus Ex: Human Revolution won a 2012 Apple Design Award as part of the Mac Developer Showcase.

Games

References

External links
 

1996 establishments in England
Apple Design Awards recipients
British companies established in 1996
Linux companies
Linux game porters
Macintosh software companies
Privately held companies based in London
Video game companies established in 1996
Video game companies of the United Kingdom
Video game development companies
Video game publishers